Ivan Charles "Tucker" Frederickson (born January 12, 1943) is a former American football running back for the New York Giants of the NFL. He was an All-American in college, a Heisman Trophy runner-up, the #1 pick of the 1965 NFL draft, and a Pro Bowl fullback with the Giants.

Biography
Frederickson graduated from South Broward High School in Hollywood, Florida.  A two-way player, he then attended Auburn University in Alabama, averaging 4.4 yards per carry on offense and leading the Tigers football team in interceptions as a safety on defense. In 1963, he won the Jacobs Award as the best blocking back in the Southeastern Conference.  He won it again in 1964, and was sixth in the Heisman Trophy race. Coach Shug Jordan called him "the most complete football player I've ever seen". He was an All-American in 1964. 

Frederickson was taken as the first overall pick in the 1965 NFL Draft by the New York Giants, playing six seasons for them before a knee injury forced his retirement in 1971. He was inducted in the College Football Hall of Fame in 1994.

Frederickson is referred to by Brian Piccolo (James Caan) as the man to beat in 1971's Brian's Song as both of them went to the same high school. In fact they went to different high schools, Frederickson to South Broward and Piccolo to Central Catholic (now St. Thomas Aquinas). Tucker went to the coveted Auburn University while Piccolo had to "settle" for Wake Forest.

External links
Hall of Fame Bio
NFL Player Statistics

1943 births
Living people
All-American college football players
American football running backs
National Football League first-overall draft picks
Auburn Tigers football players
New York Giants players
Eastern Conference Pro Bowl players
Players of American football from Florida
Frederickson, Tucker